Hyacinthe Deleplace (born 25 June 1989) is a visually impaired Paralympian athlete from France competing mainly in category T12 middle-distance and sprint events. He also won several medals in para-alpine skiing at the 2021 World Para Snow Sports Championships held in Lillehammer, Norway. Valentin Giraud Moine and Maxime Jourdan have competed as his sighted guide.

He won the bronze medal in the men's downhill visually impaired event at the 2022 Winter Paralympics held in Beijing, China. He also competed in each of the other visually impaired alpine skiing events at the 2022 Winter Paralympics.

Notes

External links
 
 

Paralympic athletes of France
Athletes (track and field) at the 2012 Summer Paralympics
1989 births
Living people
French male middle-distance runners
French male sprinters
People from Villeurbanne
French male alpine skiers
Alpine skiers at the 2022 Winter Paralympics
Paralympic medalists in alpine skiing
Paralympic bronze medalists for France
Paralympic alpine skiers of France
Sportspeople from Lyon Metropolis
21st-century French people